Oil Companies International Marine Forum (OCIMF) is a voluntary association of oil companies having an interest in the shipment and terminalling of crude oil, oil products, petrochemicals and gas, and includes companies engaged in offshore marine operations supporting oil and gas exploration, development and production.

OCIMF's aim is to ensure that the global marine industry causes no harm to people or the environment. OCIMF's mission is lead the global marine industry in the promotion of safe and environmentally responsible transportation of crude oil, oil products, petrochemicals and gas, and to drive the same values in the management of related offshore marine operations. This is to be done by developing best practices in the design, construction and safe operation of tankers, barges and offshore vessels and their interfaces with terminals and considering human factors in everything done.

History
OCIMF was formed at a meeting in London on 8 April 1970. It was initially the oil industry's response to increasing public awareness of marine pollution, particularly by oil, after the Torrey Canyon incident.e 

Governments had reacted to this incident by debating the development of international conventions and national legislation and the oil industry sought to play its part by making its professional expertise available and its views known to governmental and inter-governmental bodies. The role of OCIMF has broadened over the intervening period. Most recently the organisation has contributed to the EU discussion on tanker safety and the draft EU Directive on Environmental Liability, and has provided support to the European Union (EU) and the International Maritime Organization (IMO) debate on the accelerated phasing out of single-hull tankers and on the carriage of heavy grades of oil.

OCIMF was incorporated in Bermuda in 1977 and a branch office was established in London primarily to maintain contact with the IMO.

Organisation
OCIMF has 110 members. OCIMF’s committee structure comprises the Executive Committee at its head and four senior standing committees with the power to establish sub-committees or forums as necessary. The Executive Committee is the senior policymaking Committee of OCIMF. The membership of the Executive Committee is limited to a maximum of 15 members plus the Chairman and Vice Chairmen who are ex officio members. Members of the Executive Committee are elected at the Annual General Meeting. Present chairman is Mark Ross from Chevron Shipping Company. A full-time Director, currently Rob Drysdale from ExxonMobil, is in charge of a small permanent Secretariat located in London. This Secretariat comprises full-time employees and technical staff seconded from member companies. The work of OCIMF is carried out through four main Committees General Purposes Committee (GPC), Ports and Terminals Committee, Offshore Marine Committee and the Legal Committee. Sub-Committees, Forums, work groups and task forces composed of members' representatives and assisted by the Secretariat.

Publications
OCIMF produces industry guidance for oil tankers and oil terminals, including the leading industry title 'International Safety Guide for Tankers and Terminals' (the 6th edition was published in 2020). 

The OCIMF along with the Society of International Gas Tanker and Terminal Operators (SIGTTO) developed the Jetty Maintenance and Inspection Guide (JMIG) to provide guidelines for effective maintenance on oil and liquified gas terminal jetty equipment.

References

External links
Official website

Tanker shipping companies
Petroleum industry
Energy business associations